Kamil Khuchbarov (born 28 August 1999) is a professional Ukrainian football midfielder.

Career
Khuchbarov is a product of the FC Dnipro Youth Sportive School system. In March 2017 he was promoted to the main-team squad of FC Dnipro, but never made his debut in the Ukrainian Premier League.

In June 2017 he joined the new created SC Dnipro-1 and made his debut for this club in the winning match against FC Metalist 1925 Kharkiv on 15 July 2017 in the Ukrainian Second League as a substituted player.

References

External links

1999 births
Living people
Footballers from Dnipro
Ukrainian footballers
FC Inhulets Petrove players
SC Dnipro-1 players
FC Kolos Kovalivka players
FC VPK-Ahro Shevchenkivka players
FC Bukovyna Chernivtsi players
Ukrainian First League players
Ukraine youth international footballers
Association football midfielders